The 2013 New Zealand Warriors season was the nineteenth season in the club's history. Coached by Matthew Elliott and captained by Simon Mannering, the Warriors competed in the National Rugby League's 2013 Telstra Premiership. They finished the regular season in 11th (out of 16 teams), failing to make the finals for the second consecutive year.

Milestones
12 October 2012: Matthew Elliot was appointed coach for the next two seasons.
16 January: Simon Mannering is reconfirmed as captain for the 2013 season.
9 February - All Stars match: Feleti Mateo and Shaun Johnson represent the NRL All Stars team and Dane Nielsen represents the Indigenous All Stars in the 2013 All Stars match.
9 March - Round 1: Dane Nielsen and Todd Lowrie made their debuts for the club.
24 March - Round 3: Ngani Laumape made his first grade debut.
19–21 April: The Warriors provided 7 players to the three representative matches held over the weekend. Ben Matulino, Elijah Taylor and Shaun Johnson played for New Zealand, Glen Fisiiahi and Siliva Havili played for Tonga, Carlos Tuimavave played for Samoa and Feleti Mateo played for City.
11 May - Round 9: Suaia Matagi made his first grade debut.
18 May - Round 10: Feleti Mateo plays in his 150th NRL match. The Warriors lose 6-62 to the Penrith Panthers, their largest ever loss in the club's history.
3 June - Round 12: Jacob Lillyman played in his 150th NRL match, Shaun Johnson played in his 50th NRL match and Dominique Peyroux made his debut for the club.
7 July - Round 17: Charlie Gubb made his debut for the club.
7 September - Round 26: Sio Siua Taukeiaho made his debut for the club. Jacob Lillyman played in his 100th match for the club.
October - November: 15 players from the club participated in the World Cup: Kevin Locke, Manu Vatuvei, Thomas Leuluai, Shaun Johnson, Elijah Taylor, Simon Mannering, Ben Matulino (New Zealand), Pita Godinet, Suaia Matagi, Michael Sio (Samoa), Glen Fisiiahi, Konrad Hurrell, Siliva Havili (Tonga), Dominique Peyroux, Hikule'o Malu (Cook Islands).

Jersey and sponsors

Fixtures

Pre-season training
Pre-season training began on 5 November 2012. Australian wrestler and mixed martial arts fighter Brad Morris was employed on the Warriors coaching staff. The team was based at the Millennium Institute of Sport and Health and North Harbour Stadium during the pre-Christmas period. Four players joined the squad on pre-season trial contracts; Charlie Gubb, Suaia Matagi, Atelea Nafetalai, Nathaniel Peteru.

Pre-season matches

Regular season 
The Warriors will play ten home matches at Mount Smart Stadium, one at Eden Park and another at Westpac Stadium in Wellington. This will be the Warriors first home match held outside of Auckland.

Ladder

Squad

Staff
Chief Executive Officer: Wayne Scurrah
General Manager: Don Mann Jr
General Manager Football Operations: Dean Bell
Medical Services Manager: John Mayhew
Welfare and Education Manager: Jerry Seuseu
Media and Communications Manager: Richard Becht

Coaching staff
NRL Head Coach: Matthew Elliott
NRL Assistant Coach: Andrew McFadden
NRL Assistant Coach: Ricky Henry
NYC Head Coach: John Ackland
NYC Assistant Coach: Kelvin Wright
Junior Recruitment and Pathways Coach: Stacey Jones

Strength and Conditioning
Strength and Conditioning Coach: Carl Jennings
Strength and Conditioning Coach: Ruben Wiki
Sports Science Manager: Brad Morris
Rehab and Speed Coach: Dayne Norton
Performance Analyst: Adam Sadler

Transfers

Gains

Losses

Other teams
The Junior Warriors again competed in the Holden Cup while senior players who were not required for the first team played with the Auckland Vulcans in the NSW Cup.

Holden Cup Squad

In John Ackland's last season with the club, the Junior Warriors made the grand final, before losing 30-42 to the Penrith Panthers juniors.

Grand Final team: David Fusitua, Metia Lisati, Adam Tuimavave-Gerrard, Ngataua Hukatai, Viliami Lolohea, Tuimoala Lolohea, Mason Lino, James Taylor, Siliva Havili, Albert Vete, Michael Sio, Raymond Faitala-Mariner and David Bhana (c). Bench: Eko Malu, Sam Lisone, Kouma Samson, Solomone Kata.

Seventeen Junior Warriors attended an NRL rookie camp on 24 and 25 November 2012. They were Vincent Afoa, Katamiro Atera, Trent Bishop, Raymond Faitala-Mariner, Sione Feao, David Fusitua, Ngani Laumape, Mason Lino, Sam Lisone, Kouma Samson, Kurt Robinson, Lafu Feagaiga, Tama Koopu, Kenneth Maumalo, Eric Newbigging, Sam Cook and Esera Esera.

Vulcans squad

The Vulcans were coached by Willie Swann, who was assisted by Brent Gemmel.

The Vulcans made the finals, losing to the Wests Tigers 24-34 in an elimination final.

The 2013 squad was Aaron Nootai, Agnatius Paasi, Atelea Nafetalai, Daniel Palavi, Murray Iti, Nathaniel Peteru, Steve Waetford, Tangi Ropati and Zoram Watene. In addition, the Vulcans were able to select players contracted to the Warriors and not selected for first grade, including four under 20 players; Ngani Laumape, Siliva Havili, Trent Bishop and Visesio Setefano.

Suaia Matagi was named the player of the year, ahead of runner up Tangi Ropati. John Palavi was named the rookie of the year.

Awards
Captain Simon Mannering won the Player of the Year award while Ngani Laumape won Rookie of the Year. The Clubman of the Year was Manu Vatuvei and Shaun Johnson won the People's Player of the Year, decided by public vote. Jerome Ropati was presented with a special Legacy Award.

References

External links
Warriors 2013 season rugby league project

New Zealand Warriors seasons
New Zealand Warriors season
Warriors season